Aadade Aadharam was an Indian Telugu-language soap opera that aired on ETV. It aired from Monday to Saturday on afternoons. It premiered on 26 January 2009 and is the third longest-running Indian television soap opera after Yeh Rishta Kya Kehlata Hai and  Abhishekam.It had a total of 3329 episodes with last episode aired on 14 March 2020.

Cast
Pallavi Ramisetty as Amrutha
 Madhulika
 Shak Màdhan Bee (Madhu)
 Rajasri Nair
 Sujatha Reddy
 Sadhana
 Sindhura
 Lakshmi Sri
 Sobha
 Amulya
 Deepti
 Aditya
 Sindhura Dharshanam
Divya Deepika as vaijayanthi

Plot
The show is about a woman who goes on with her life despite facing several issues. The female lead is named ‘Amrita', who is a professional Lawyer.

Vikas a criminal plans to abduct a rich girl named Renuka but his plan is foiled when his friends abducts Amrita instead mistaking her for Renuka.

Next day, when she returns to the hostal, she was questioned for spending night outside of the 'Lakshmana Leka' drawn around her. She becomes victim of misunderstanding. Spunned by even her parents, her tale of misery begins.

Despite those tragic circumstances she moves ahead in life. Her indefatigable courage enables her to fight with criminals, including Vikas.She strives very hard in her life to make her own mark.

The story progresses through different characters with whom she interacts. She continues her fight against criminals by supporting her clients and seeking justice for them. Despite all the hurdles she faces she holds on to her morals and faces all the challenges and difficulties with courage.

See also
List of longest-running Indian television series

References

External links

Telugu-language television shows
2010s Indian television series
2009 Indian television series debuts
Indian television soap operas
ETV Telugu original programming
2020 Indian television series endings